The Clastodermataceae are a family of slime molds in the order Echinosteliales. The family was circumscribed in 1971. The family contains two genera, Barbeyella and Clastoderma, that have a total of three species.

References

Myxogastria
Amoebozoa families